Alsvåg Church is a parish church of the Church of Norway in Øksnes Municipality in Nordland county, Norway. It is located in the village of Alsvåg on the island of Langøya. It is one of the churches for the Øksnes parish which is part of the Vesterålen prosti (deanery) in the Diocese of Sør-Hålogaland. The white, wooden church was built in a long church style in 1923 using plans drawn up by the architect R. Randulf. The church seats about 300 people.

History
The building was originally constructed in 1923 as an annex chapel. In 1949, the building was upgraded and renovated to gain parish church status. It was consecrated that same year. The church was renovated in 2009.

Media gallery

See also
List of churches in Sør-Hålogaland

References

Øksnes
Churches in Nordland
Wooden churches in Norway
20th-century Church of Norway church buildings
Churches completed in 1923
1923 establishments in Norway
Long churches in Norway